The 2014–15 season was Charlton Athletic's third consecutive season in The Football League Championship, the second tier of the English football league system.

Squad statistics

Appearances and goals

 

|}

Top scorers

Disciplinary record

Football League Championship

League table

Results summary

Results by round

Fixtures and results

Pre-season

Championship
The fixtures for the 2014–15 season were announced on 18 June 2014 at 9am.

League Cup

The draw for the first round was made on 17 June 2014 at 10am. Charlton Athletic were drawn at home to Colchester United.

FA Cup

Transfers

In

Out

Loan in

Loan out

References

Notes

Charlton Athletic F.C. seasons
Charlton Athletic F.C.